Back of My Mind is the debut studio album by American R&B singer H.E.R. It was released on June 18, 2021, through RCA. The album features guest performances from YG, Lil Baby, Ty Dolla Sign, Yung Bleu, Cordae, DJ Khaled, Bryson Tiller and Chris Brown. The music was written and produced with a host of musicians, including Mike Will Made-It, Hit-Boy, Tiara Thomas, Kaytranada, Thundercat and Darkchild, amongst others. 

Back of My Mind was met with positive reactions, with critics praising the singer's musical showcase to a greater, matured extent and the album's cohesion within various R&B sounds. The album was proceeded by three singles: "Slide", featuring rapper YG, released on September 29, 2019, "Damage", released on October 21, 2020 and "Come Through" featuring Chris Brown, released on April 23, 2021. The album contains an alternative version of the song "I Can Have It All", which also appears on DJ Khaled's 2021 album Khaled Khaled. The album debuted at number six on the Billboard 200 after moving over 36,000 album-equivalent units. With this, it became her highest charting album and first top 10 entry on the chart. 

The album received two nominations for Album of the Year and Best R&B Album at the 64th Annual Grammy Awards, it marks her third and second nominations in the categories respectively. "Damage" also received nominations for Best R&B Performance and Best R&B Song.

Background 
Gabriella Wilson, professionally known as H.E.R., rose to prominence in late 2016 and early 2017 following a series of EP's, named H.E.R. Vol.1 and H.E.R. Vol.2 respectively. Following this she released her first compilation album known as her eponymous debut project H.E.R. which is a combination of both formerly released EP's and a handful of additional songs, including "Best Part", a duet with R&B singer Daniel Caesar. The album was nominated for Album of the Year at the 61st Annual Grammy Awards with H.E.R. earning two Grammy awards the same year. Following the release of H.E.R., she released a new compilation album in 2019, also a combination of formerly released EP's, titled I Used to Know Her. In 2020, following the George Floyd protests she released the song "I Can't Breathe". The song was awarded with Song of the Year at the 63rd Annual Grammy Awards. On June 10, 2021, H.E.R announced the album release date and a trailer on her social media accounts. The following day, she announced the album pre-order alongside the album's fifth single "We Made It". The following week, H.E.R continued teasing the album by posting photos from its photoshoot, and revealed the tracklist the day before its release.

Singles 
The lead single "Slide" was released on September 27, 2019. The song debuted at number 85 on the US Billboard Hot 100 in January 2020, later peaking at number 43, becoming H.E.R.'s highest entry on the chart. "Damage" was released as the second single on October 21, 2020. It reached number one on Urban Radio and peaked at number 44 on the Hot 100 chart, and was certified platinum by the RIAA on May 21, 2021.  "Hold On" was then released as the third single on October 25, 2020.

On April 23, 2021, H.E.R. released "Come Through", a duet with American singer Chris Brown, as the third single off the album, with a music video for the song premiered on May 13. The song was certified gold by RIAA in September 2021. "We Made It" was released as a promotional single off the album on June 11, 2021.

Critical reception 

On review aggregator Metacritic, the album has a score of 75, indicating it received mainly positive reviews, based on seven critic reviews. Andy Kellman of AllMusic in a mixed review said that on the album "H.E.R. is often too accommodating". Reed Jackson of Pitchfork said that "Ballads were a staple of H.E.R.’s initial five EPs, and she again uses them frequently on Back of My Mind, for better or worse. Nearly all of them are simple and pretty". Writing for Exclaim!, Antoine-Samuel Mauffette Alavo reviewed the album positively, proclaiming H.E.R. is "in total control of her sound, with masterful command of her artistic direction" and complimenting the ease of adapting her "signature sounds" to fit the featured artists on the project. HipHopDX's Riley Wallace stated that "H.E.R. doesn’t push the genre or her artistry forward with this debut, but she more than proves herself a worthy torchbearer for the art of R&B balladry".

Commercial performance 
Back of My Mind debuted at number six on the Billboard 200 chart dated July 3, 2021, with 36,000 album-equivalent units, marking H.E.R.’s best weekly performance. 29,500 of the album-equivalent units stemmed from the album's 43.56 million on-demand streams, while 5,500 were pure album sales, and 1,000 were from track-equivalent units.

The album debuted at number one on the Billboard Top R&B Albums Chart, and number four on the Billboard Top R&B/Hip-Hop Albums chart. In addition, six of the album’s tracks landed on the Hot R&B Songs chart.

H.E.R. jumped 84-32 on Billboard Artist 100, which ranks artist popularity, giving her best showing on the chart in over two years, since she climbed to her number 26 career peak in February 2019.

Accolades

Track listing 

 
Notes
 The Apple Music version of the album credits Hit-Boy as a lead artist on "Trauma"
 "Damage" features additional vocals by Ant Clemons
 "I Can Have It All" is a solo version from the album Khaled Khaled without Meek Mill
 
Sample credits
 “We Made It” contains samples of “It’s the Falling in Love”, written by David Foster and Carole Bayer Sager, as performed by Bayer Sager.
 "Damage" contains samples of "Making Love in the Rain", written by James Harris and Terry Lewis, as performed by Herb Alpert featuring Lisa Keith and Janet Jackson.
 "Closer to Me" contains samples of "Closer", written by Goapele Mohlabane, Amp Live, and Mike Tiger, as performed by Goapele.
 "Cheat Code" contains samples of "The Sweetest Thing", written by Lauryn Hill as performed by Refugee Camp All-Stars featuring Hill from the Love Jones soundtrack.
 "Slide" contains an interpolation of "Money Ain't a Thang", written by Jermaine Dupri, Shawn Carter, Steve Arrington, Charles Carter, Buddy Hank, and Roger Parker, as performed by Dupri featuring Jay-Z.

Charts

Weekly charts

Year-end charts

Certifications

References 

 

2021 debut albums
H.E.R. albums
RCA Records albums